Jun Chen is a Chinese American astronomer and discoverer of minor planets.

She obtained her BS at Beijing University in 1990, and obtained her PhD from the University of Hawaii in 1997. Working together with David Jewitt and Jane Luu and other astronomers, she has co-discovered a number of Kuiper belt objects. The Minor Planet Center credits her with the co-discovery of 10 minor planets during 1994–1997.

She is currently working as a software developer in private industry.

See also

References 
 

Living people
20th-century American astronomers
American women astronomers
Chinese emigrants to the United States

Discoverers of trans-Neptunian objects
Planetary scientists
Women planetary scientists
Peking University alumni
University of Hawaiʻi at Mānoa alumni
Year of birth missing (living people)